Joseph Anthony Miller (October 6, 1898 – August 1, 1963) was a Canadian professional ice hockey player and a Grey Cup champion Canadian football player. Miller was a goaltender for the New York Americans, New York Rangers, Pittsburgh Pirates and Philadelphia Quakers between 1927 and 1931. Miller was a member of the 1928 New York Rangers Stanley Cup championship team.

Hockey
Joe Miller played for the New York Americans in 1928 when he was sent to the minors after being waived by the Americans. By an interesting set of circumstances his Stanley Cup opportunity arose. His season with Niagara Falls over, Miller was at home in Ottawa when New York Rangers goaltender Lorne Chabot was injured in the second game of the Stanley Cup Final. Rangers coach and General manager Lester Patrick asked the Americans and the Maroons for permission to use Miller for the remainder of the series. The Americans agreed but Montreal Maroons head coach Eddie Gerard forced Lester Patrick to play goal for the rest of that game. Miller was the designated backup for all NHL teams at the time, and he was loaned to the Rangers. Miller played three games for the Rangers and won the 1928 Stanley Cup for the New York. 
 
Later he played for the Pittsburgh Pirates and the Philadelphia Quakers. He wore uniform number 1.

Football
Miller was a skilled multi-sport athlete and was an accomplished elite football player. Suiting up for three seasons with the Ottawa Senators (an interim name for the Ottawa Rough Riders) he was a star player and part of two Grey Cup championship teams. In 1925 he was integral to his team's success, but missed the Grey Cup due to his hockey commitment in St.Paul. He was the star of the 14th Grey Cup in 1926, scoring three vital late games "rouges" (single points) and staving off two critical potential turnovers.

Stanley Cup and Grey Cup legacy
Miller's amazing two sport championship achievement makes him one of only three people to have their names engraved on both of Canada premier sport trophies, the Stanley Cup and the Grey Cup, as players. The others are Lionel Conacher and Carl Voss.

In 1967 Joseph ‘Joe’ A. Miller was inducted into the Ottawa Sports Hall of Fame.

Career statistics

Regular season and playoffs

References

External links

1898 births
1963 deaths
Canadian ice hockey goaltenders
Central Hockey League (1925–1926) players
Fort Pitt Hornets players
Ice hockey people from Ontario
New York Americans players
New York Rangers players
Ottawa Rough Riders players
People from the United Counties of Stormont, Dundas and Glengarry
Philadelphia Quakers (NHL) players
Pittsburgh Athletic Association ice hockey players
Pittsburgh Pirates (NHL) players
St. Paul Saints (AHA) players
Stanley Cup champions
Syracuse Stars (IHL) players